GAF may refer to:

Military 
 General of the Air Force, US
 Ghana Armed Forces
 Guardia alla Frontiera, Italy

Other uses
 Gaf, a Perso-Arabic letter
 Gaf (Mandaeism), a demon of the Mandaean underworld
 GAF Materials Corporation, an American manufacturer
 General Aniline & Film, its predecessor
 Gafsa – Ksar International Airport, in Tunisia
 Gende language
 Global Assessment of Functioning
 Government Aircraft Factories, in Australia
 NeoGAF, formerly Gaming-Age Forums, online video-game forum

See also
Gaff (disambiguation)